The University of California Natural Reserve System (UCNRS) is a system of protected areas throughout California.

List of reserves

References

Harrison, S., Waddell, S. M. and Boucher, V. L. 2004. UC Davis Natural Reserve System-Four-Year Report (1999-2003) . UC Davis Natural Reserve System.
Herring, Margaret. 2000. Studying Nature in Nature: The History of the University of California Natural Reserve System . Reprinted from Chronicle of the University of California, No. 3 (Spring 2000).

External links

UC Office of Research and Graduate Studies
UC Natural Reserves photos

 
Nature reserves in California
Natural Reserve System